Margaret E. Grigsby was born on January 16, 1923, in Prairie View, Texas, to John Richard and Lee (Hankins) Grigsby.  She was an American physician, noteworthy as the first African American woman to become a fellow of the American College of Physicians and the first woman to preside over a major medical division at Howard University Hospital. Grigsby was best known as a Physician of Internal Medicine, with a speciality in Tropical Medicine and Infectious Disease practicing both in the United States and Africa. Grigsby died on June 24, 2009 at the age of 86 at Howard University Hospital, Washington, D.C.

Education 
Grigsby earned her baccalaureate at Prairie View College in 1943. After earning her baccalaureate, she attended the University of Michigan to receive her medical degree. After obtaining her M.D., she toured the countries that were part of the Soviet Union in 1960 and presented papers in Moscow, Warsaw, and Prague. While Grigsby was abroad she continued her work as a professor of medicine at the University of Ibadan in Nigeria. In 1963 Grisby received a Diploma in Tropical Medicine & Hygiene from the London School of Hygiene and Tropical Medicine. Soon after, Grigsby received an award in 1967 as a distinguished professor of medicine in West Africa. Her contributions to smallpox medicine in Africa was ultimately honored with the Presidential Citation in 1972.

Career 
Starting in 1948, Grigsby interned at Homer G. Phillips Hospital in St. Louis until 1949. In 1949, she was promoted to an assistant resident of medicine, a position which she held until 1950. In 1950, Grigsby had the opportunity to be an assistant resident at Freedmen's Hospital in Washington. Thus, she transferred hospitals and worked in this position, until 1951 when Freedman's Hospital promoted her to an assistant physician. In 1956, Grigsby became an attending physician at Freedmen's Hospital and during this time she specialized in internal medicine from 1953 to 1954.

In 1957, she accepted a job at Howard University where she was an instructor of medicine. She taught as an instructor until 1957, and then she was promoted as an assistant professor at Howard. She worked as an assistant professor until 1960 when she became an associate professor. Grigsby worked as an associate professor until 1966 when she became a full time professor.

Nevertheless, throughout Grigsby's career she also held other positions. At Howard, she worked as the chief of infectious diseases from 1952 to 1971, and an administrative assistant for the department of medicine school social work from 1961 to 1963.

In addition to her positions at Howard, Grigsby held a couple positions in Ibadan, Nigeria. She had a position in the Epidemiologist United States Public Health Service from 1966 to 1968, and served as an honorary visiting professor for preventive and social medicine from 1967 to 1968.

Throughout the course of Grigsby’s two years in Africa, she oversaw the smallpox inoculation of millions of individuals. Grigsby was able to do this through the Smallpox Eradication Program  from Howard University College of Medicine. After returning from Africa she continued her profession as a professor at Howard University until she retired in 1993.

Degrees and awards 
 National Board Medical Examiners, American Board Internal Medicine. Rockefeller Foundation fellow Harvard University, 1951-1952
 Research fellow Thorndike Memorial Laboratory, Boston City Hospital, 1951-1952
 China Medical Board fellow tropical medicine University Puerto Rico, 1956
 Commonwealth Fund Fellow University London, 1962-1963
 Surgeon General’s Certificate of Appreciation, 1987
 Leonard F. Sain Esteemed Alumni Award, 1987

References 

20th-century American women physicians
20th-century American physicians
African-American physicians
1923 births
2009 deaths
Prairie View A&M University alumni
University of Michigan Medical School alumni
Academic staff of the University of Ibadan
American expatriate academics
American expatriates in Nigeria
Howard University faculty
Physicians from Texas
People from Prairie View, Texas
20th-century African-American women
20th-century African-American people
American women academics
21st-century African-American people
21st-century African-American women